Petromarula is a genus  of plants in the family Campanulaceae. There is only one known species, Petromarula pinnata, endemic to the island of Crete in the Mediterranean. The name "Petromarula" means "rock lettuce" in Greek, a reference to the plant's traditional use in salads.

Description
Petromarula pinnata is a robust, medium to tall perennial, minutely hairy above. Leaves mostly in a large basal rosette, pinnate to pinnately-lobed, the lower long-stalked; leaflets oval to oblong, coarsely toothed. Flowers pale blue, 9–10 mm, borne in large rather narrow panicles; corolla with 5 spreading to recurved linear lobes. Capsule opening by 3 pores in the middle. Flowers April–May.

Habitat
Rock crevices, cliffs and old walls.

Gallery

References

External links

Cretan Flora, Petromarula pinnata
Flowers of Chania, Petromarula pinnata
Dave's Garden, PlantFiles: Cretan Wall-Lettuce Petromarula pinnata
Cretan Vista, Flowers of Northwest Crete,  Bellflower, Petromarula pinnata
First Nature, Petromarula pinnata - Rock Lettuce
Biodiversity Sitia, Βιοποικιλότητα Δήμου Σητείας | Petromarula pinnata Πετρομάρουλο 

Campanuloideae
Flora of Crete
Edible plants
Monotypic Campanulaceae genera